

Charaxes castor, the giant emperor or giant charaxes, is a butterfly of the family Nymphalidae. It is found throughout the Afrotropical realm below the Sahel.

The flight period is year-round but more common in late summer to autumn.

Description

The wingspan is 75–85 mm in males and 85–105 mm in females. The ground-colour of the upper surface deep black, as in Charaxes brutus ; the median band is light ochre-yellow, on the forewing anteriorly double, being composed in cellules 2—6 of two more or less completely separated spots, on the hindwing short and triangular, reaching at most to vein 3. On the under surface the white-bordered markings of the basal area are deep black. — castor Cr. has a light orange-yellow median band and the light marginal spots of the forewing are absent or very small; the ground-colour of the under surface is in the basal part red-brown or pure black (= ab. godarti Auriv.). Senegambia to the Congo and Uganda. — flavifasciatus Btlr. is the East African race, which occurs from Delagoa Bay and Nyassaland to Somaliland and only differs in the lighter median band and the more distinct marginal spots on the upperside of 
the forewing; in this form also the ground-colour in the basal part of the under surface is sometimes red-brown, sometimes pure black (= ab. reimeri Rothsch.). — comoranus Rothsch. agrees with the West African form as regards the colour of the discal band on the upper surface, but differs in the transverse band which accompanies the white discal band of the upper surface on its distal side; this is yellow on the forewing and red-brown on the hindwing and — unlike that of all the continental forms — broken up into spots. Island of Great Comoro.
A full description is given by Walter Rothschild and Karl Jordan, 1900 Novitates Zoologicae Volume 7:287-524.  page 436 et seq. (for terms see Novitates Zoologicae Volume 5:545-601 )

Natural History
Life-sized colour plates and description of the larval and pupal stages of C. castor and additional related species, illustrated by Dr. V. G. L. van Someren, are readily available.

Biology
The habitat is forest and savanna. Notes on the biology of castor are given by Pringle et al (1994), Larsen, T.B. (1991), Larsen, T.B. (2005) and  Kielland, J. (1990),

Larval foodplants
Larvae feed on Bridelia micrantha, Afzelia quanzensis, Tragia spp., Gymnosporia spp., Maytenus senegalensis, Schotia brachypetala, Bridelia micrantha and Cassia fistula.

Subspecies
Listed alphabetically.
C. c. arthuri van Someren, 1971 <ref>van Someren, V.G.L. 1971. Revisional notes on African Charaxes]] (Lepidoptera:Nymphalidae). Part VII. Bulletin of the British Museum (Natural History) (Entomology) 26:181-226.</ref> (Pemba island)C. c. castor (Cramer, [1775]) (throughout African range)C. c. comoranus Rothschild, 1903 .(Comoros)C. c. flavifasciatus Butler, 1895  (eastern Kenya, northern and eastern Tanzania, Malawi, Mozambique, eastern Zimbabwe, South Africa, Eswatini)

Related Species
Historical attempts to assemble a cluster of presumably related species into a "Charaxes jasius Group" have not been wholly convincing. More recent taxonomic revision, corroborated by phylogenetic research, allow a more rational grouping congruent with cladistic relationships. Within a well-populated clade of 27 related species sharing a common ancestor approximately 16 mya during the Miocene, 26 are now considered together as The jasius Group.  One of the two lineages forms a robust clade of seven species sharing a common ancestor approximately 2-3 mya, i.e. during the Pliocene, and are considered as the jasius subgroup.

The jasius Group (26 Species)

Clade 1: jasius subgroup (7 species):Charaxes jasiusCharaxes epijasius [stat.rev.2005]Charaxes legeriCharaxes saturnus [stat.rev.2005]Charaxes peliasCharaxes castorCharaxes hansaliClade 2: contains the well-populated three additional subgroups (19 species) of the jasius Group, called the brutus, pollux, and eudoxus subgroups. Further exploration of the phylogenetic relationships amongst existing Charaxes'' taxa is required to improve clarity.

References

External links
Charaxes castor castor images at Consortium for the Barcode of Life
Charaxes castor comoranus images at BOLD
Charaxes castor flavifasciatus images at BOLD
Images of C.  castor castor Royal Museum for Central Africa (Albertine Rift Project)
African Butterfly Database Range map via search

castor
Butterflies described in 1775
Taxa named by Pieter Cramer